The 1997 FIS Ski Jumping Grand Prix was the 4th Summer Grand Prix season in ski jumping on plastic. The season began on 14 August 1997 in Courchevel, France and ended on 31 August 1997 in Stams, Austria.

Other competitive circuits this season included the World Cup and Continental Cup.

Calendar

Men

Standings

Overall

Nations Cup

References

Grand Prix
FIS Grand Prix Ski Jumping